Mart Murdvee (March 18, 1951 - January 29, 2022) was an Estonian psychologist and scholar.

He was trained at Tartu University and has worked with Mare Teichmann and others.

His son is the conductor and violinist Mikk Murdvee.

References 

1951 births
Living people
Estonian psychologists
Estonian scholars